These are the results of the men's C-2 slalom competition in canoeing at the 2000 Summer Olympics. The C-2 (canoe single) event is raced by two-man canoes through a whitewater course.  The venue for the 2000 Olympic competition was at Penrith Whitewater Stadium.

Medalists

Results

Qualifying
The 12 teams each took two runs through the whitewater slalom course on 19 September. The combined score of both runs counted for the event with the top eight advancing to the final the following day.

Final
The eight teams each took two runs through the whitewater slalom course on 20 September. The combined score of both runs counted for the event.

References

2000 Summer Olympics Canoe slalom results. 
Sports-reference.com 2000 men's slalom C-2 results
Wallechinsky, David and Jaime Loucky (2008). "Canoeing: Men's Canadian Slalom Pairs". In The Complete Book of the Olympics: 2008 Edition. London: Aurum Press Limited. p. 488.

Men's Slalom C-2
Men's events at the 2000 Summer Olympics